Typhoons in the Philippines can occur any time of the year, with the months of June to September being most active, with August being the most active individual month and May the least active. Approximately 20 tropical cyclones enter the Philippine area of responsibility yearly, an area which incorporates parts of the Pacific Ocean, the South China Sea, and the Philippine Archipelago (with the exception of Tawi-Tawi province). In each year, ten cyclones are usually expected to be typhoons, with five having the potential to be destructive ones. According to a 2013 Time Magazine article, the Philippines is "the most exposed country in the world to tropical storms". In the Philippine languages, tropical cyclones are generally called .

Typhoons usually move east to west across the country, heading north or west as they go. Storms most frequently make landfall on the islands of Eastern Visayas, Bicol region, and northern Luzon, whereas the southern island and region of Mindanao is largely free of typhoons. Climate change is likely to worsen the situation, with extreme weather events including typhoons posing various risks and threats to the Philippines.

The deadliest overall tropical cyclone to affect the Philippines is believed to have been the Haiphong typhoon, which is estimated to have killed up to 20,000 people as it passed over the country in September 1881. In modern meteorological records, the deadliest storm was Typhoon Yolanda (international name Haiyan), which became the strongest landfalling tropical cyclone on record at that time as it crossed the Visayas in central Philippines on November 7–8, 2013. Tropical cyclones usually account for at least 30 percent of the annual rainfall in the northern Philippines while being responsible for less than 10 percent of the annual rainfall in the southern islands. PAGASA Senior Weather Specialist Anthony Lucero told the newsite Rappler that the number of destructive typhoons have increased recently but it is too early to call it a trend.

Tropical cyclones entering the Philippine Area of Responsibility, as well as tropical depressions that form within it, are given a local name by the Philippine Atmospheric, Geophysical and Astronomical Services Administration (PAGASA), which also raises public storm signal warnings as deemed necessary.

Preparation and response to typhoons is coordinated by the National Disaster Risk Reduction and Management Council (NDRRMC). Each Philippine province and local government in the Philippines has a corresponding Disaster Risk Reduction and Management Office (DRRMO). Each provincial and local government is required to set aside 5% of its yearly budget for disaster risk reduction, preparations, and response.

The frequency of typhoons in the Philippines have made typhoons a significant part of everyday ancient and modern Filipino culture.

Etymology
 (sometimes spelled  or ) is the word for 'typhoon' or 'storm' in most Philippine languages, including Tagalog, Visayan, Ilocano, Bicolano, Hanunó'o, Aklanon, Pangasinan and Kapampangan. It is derived from Proto-Austronesian *, meaning 'typhoon'.

Storm naming conventions: local and international names

The Joint Typhoon Warning Center in Honolulu started monitoring and naming storms in the Western Pacific region in 1945, originally using female names in English alphabetical order. That list was revised in 1979 by introducing male names to be used in alternation with the female names. The Philippine Weather Bureau started naming storms within their area of responsibility in 1963, using female Filipino names ending in the former native alphabetical order. The Bureau continued to monitor typhoons until the agency's abolition in 1972, after which its duties were transferred to the newly established PAGASA. This often resulted in a Western Pacific cyclone carrying two names: an international name and a local name used within the Philippines. This two-name scheme is still followed today.

In 2000, cyclone monitoring duties in the Western Pacific were transferred from the JTWC to the Japan Meteorological Agency, the RSMC of the World Meteorological Organization. The international naming scheme of the typhoons was replaced with a sequential list of names contributed by 14 nations in the region, including the Philippines. The new scheme largely uses terms for local features of the contributing nation, such as animals, plants, foods and adjectives in the native language. The rotation of names is based on the alphabetical order of the contributing nations. The Philippines, however, would maintain its own naming scheme for its local forecasts. In 2001, PAGASA revised its naming scheme to contain longer annual lists with a more mixed set of names.

Currently, the JMA and PAGASA each assign names to typhoons that form within or enter the Philippine Area of Responsibility. The JMA naming scheme for international use contains 140 names described above. The list is not restricted by year; the first name to be used in a typhoon season is the name after the last-named cyclone of the preceding season. The PAGASA naming scheme for Philippine use contains four lists, each containing twenty-five names arranged in alphabetical order. Every typhoon season begins with the first name in the assigned list, and the rolls of names are each reused every four years. An auxiliary list of ten names is used when the main list in a year had been exhausted. Not all Western Pacific cyclones are given names by both weather agencies, as JMA does not name tropical depressions, and PAGASA does not name cyclones outside the Philippine Area of Responsibility.

In the case of both weather agencies, names are retired after a typhoon that carried it caused severe or costly damage and loss of life. Retirement is decided by the agencies' committees, although in PAGASA's case, names are routinely retired when the cyclone caused at least 300 deaths or ₱1 billion in damage in the Philippines. Retired names are replaced with another name for the next rotation, for JMA by the nation that submitted the retired name, and for PAGASA with a name sharing the same first letter as the retired name.

Variability in activity

On an annual time scale, activity reaches a minimum in May, before increasing steadily to June, and spiking from July to September, with August being the most active month for tropical cyclones in the Philippines. Activity reduces significantly in October. The most active season, since 1945, for tropical cyclone strikes on the island archipelago was 1993 when nineteen tropical cyclones moved through the country (though there were 36 storms that were named by PAGASA). There was only one tropical cyclone which moved through the Philippines in 1958. The most frequently impacted areas of the Philippines by tropical cyclones are northern Luzon and eastern Visayas. A ten-year average of satellite determined precipitation showed that at least 30 percent of the annual rainfall in the northern Philippines could be traced to tropical cyclones, while the southern islands receive less than 10 percent of their annual rainfall from tropical cyclones.

Tropical cyclone warning signals

The Philippine Atmospheric, Geophysical and Astronomical Services Administration (PAGASA) releases tropical cyclone warnings in the form of tropical cyclone warning signals. On March 23, 2022, PAGASA revised definition of super typhoon, signal system. An area having a storm signal may be under:
(Note: If a tropical cyclone forms very close to the area, then a shorter lead time is seen on the warning bulletin.)

These tropical cyclone warning signals are usually raised when an area (in the Philippines only) is about to be hit by a tropical cyclone.  As a tropical cyclone gains strength and/or gets nearer to an area having a storm signal, the warning may be upgraded to a higher one in that particular area (e.g. a signal No. 1 warning for an area may be increased to signal #3).  Conversely, as a tropical cyclone weakens and/or gets farther to an area, it may be downgraded to a lower signal or may be lifted (that is, an area will have no storm signal).

Classes for preschool are canceled when signal No. 1 is in effect. Elementary and high school classes and below are canceled under signal No. 2 and classes for colleges, universities and below are canceled under signal Nos. 3, 4 and 5.

List of Philippine typhoons

Pre–1963 
The JTWC was already naming tropical cyclones in the Northwest Pacific basin since 1945, before the Philippines did so. Only a few notable storms persisted before 1963. In November 1912, a typhoon swept through the central Philippines and "practically destroyed" Tacloban. In Tacloban and Capiz on the island of Panay, the death toll was 15,000, half the population of those cities at the time. In 1881, a typhoon also impacted Northern Luzon, but around 20,000 people have died from the typhoon, making it the deadliest Philippine typhoon in recorded history.

1963–1999 

In 1963, the PAGASA began naming tropical cyclones that enter their area of responsibility using female names ending with "ng". During the period 1963 to 1999, the Philippines experienced several typhoons that affected or made landfall. Moreover, this period saw the most active typhoon season in the Philippines ― with 31 typhoons being named by PAGASA ― in 1993.

This period saw several notable and deadly typhoons that passed anywhere in the country. Typhoon Patsy (Yoling) of 1970 became one of the deadliest typhoons to strike Metro Manila. Typhoon Nina (Sisang) in 1987 became one of the strongest typhoons to hit the Bicol Region. Typhoon Yunya (Diding) in June 1991 struck Luzon at the time of the colossal eruption of Mount Pinatubo. Later in the same year, Tropical Storm Thelma (Uring) became one of the most deadliest storms to hit the country, killing just over 5,000 people.

2000–present 

In the beginning of this period, significant changes were seen in the naming of tropical cyclones in the Northwest Pacific ― the Japan Meteorological Agency (JMA), as the Regional Specialized Meteorological Center (RSMC) of the basin, took over the naming of tropical cyclones by 2000, and the PAGASA revised its naming scheme to contain longer annual lists with a more mixed set of names by 2001. Adjustments in the Philippine cyclone names also occurred in 2005 and in 2021.

The strongest typhoon to make landfall in the country during this time period was Typhoon Haiyan (Yolanda) in November 2013 and Typhoon Goni (Rolly) in late-October 2020, which both made landfall with 1-minute sustained winds of 315 km/h (195 mph). Typhoon Haiyan, as of this date, is also the most deadly Philippine typhoon during this period, which killed 6,300 people. Other notable Philippine storms during this period include Typhoon Ketsana (Ondoy) in September 2009 which became the most devastating tropical cyclone to hit Manila, and Typhoon Bopha (Pablo) in December 2012, which became the strongest typhoon on record to hit Mindanao.

Deadliest cyclones

Wettest recorded tropical cyclones

Most destructive

See also

 Pacific typhoon season
 Pacific typhoon season
List of Pacific typhoon seasons (1939 onwards)
List of retired Philippine typhoon names

For other storms impacting the Philippines in deadly seasons, see:
Effects of the 2009 Pacific typhoon season in the Philippines
Effects of the 2013 Pacific typhoon season in the Philippines

Notes

References

External links

Philippine Tropical Cyclone Update
Typhoon2000
Monthly typhoon tracks: 1951–2010
 Typhoon Haiyan coverage by CBS News
 CRS International relief organization quickly mobilizes to help Philippine Typhoon victims

 
Philippines